Kurt Kreuger (July 23, 1916 – July 12, 2006) was a Swiss-reared German actor. Kreuger once was the third-most-requested male actor at 20th Century Fox. He starred with, among others, Ingrid Bergman and Humphrey Bogart.

Life and career
Kreuger was born in Michendorf near Potsdam, but he grew up in Switzerland (in St. Moritz). He attended the London School of Economics and enrolled in Columbia University (New York City) to study medicine, but he soon dropped out to pursue a career in acting. His father, a businessman, cut off his allowance after he embarked seriously on an acting career.

In 1943, during the filming of Sahara, Kreuger was almost killed in a dramatic scene because the director almost forgot to say "cut". He was quoted by the San Francisco Chronicle:

I was running across the dunes when Tambul jumped on top of me and pressed my head into the sand to suffocate me. Only Zoltán forgot to yell cut, and Ingram was so emotionally caught up in the scene that he kept pressing my face harder and harder. Finally, I went unconscious. Nobody knew this. Even the crew was transfixed, watching this dramatic "killing." If Zoltán hadn't finally said cut, as an afterthought, it would have been all over for me.

Kreuger's first major film credit was in Mademoiselle Fifi, a 1944 release that is set in the Franco-Prussian War.

Kreuger was primarily offered roles in World War II films as a German officer, prompting him to complain about being typecast as a Nazi. One of Kreuger's few opportunities to play a non-Nazi role was in 1948's Unfaithfully Yours, in which he played Rex Harrison's personal assistant. When Kreuger asked Darryl F. Zanuck for better roles, Zanuck reportedly replied: "What's your hurry? With your looks, you'll be good at 50."
 
Kreuger was once the third most-requested male pinup at 20th Century Fox, after Tyrone Power and John Payne. He briefly returned to Europe and starred in several German films. He returned to the United States in 1955 after being injured in a car accident in Paris, France.
His last film was The St. Valentine's Day Massacre in 1967. He also had a number of roles in television in the 1950s and 1960s, including two guest appearances on Perry Mason and five on 77 Sunset Strip.

Personal life
Kreuger was a successful real estate investor, primarily in properties in Beverly Hills, California. He lived in Beverly Hills and had a second home in Aspen, Colorado. He enjoyed skiing and participated in that sport until he was 87.

Kreuger was married in 1951, in what he subsequently described as "three years of bliss, three years of hell." He had a son prior to an acrimonious divorce.

He died on 12 July 2006, eleven days before his 90th birthday, at Cedars-Sinai Medical Center in Los Angeles following a stroke.

Partial filmography

Mystery Sea Raider (1940) – Franz, German Seaman
Arise, My Love (1940) – German Sentry (uncredited)
Man Hunt (1941) – German Attaché (uncredited)
The Deadly Game (1941) – Lieutenant
International Squadron (1941) – Flyer (uncredited)
A Yank in the R.A.F. (1941) – German Pilot (uncredited)
The Purple V (1943) – Walter Heyse
The Moon Is Down (1943) – Orderly (uncredited)
Hangmen Also Die! (1943) – Gestapo Officer (uncredited)
Tonight We Raid Calais (1943) – German Soldier (uncredited)
Edge of Darkness (1943) – German Co-Pilot (uncredited)
Action in the North Atlantic (1943) – German U-Boat Sailor on Microphone (uncredited)
Background to Danger (1943) – Chauffeur (uncredited)
Secret Service in Darkest Africa (1943) – Ernst Muller
Sahara (1943) – Capt. von Schletow
The Strange Death of Adolf Hitler (1943) – Nazi Youth leader
None Shall Escape (1944) – Lt. Gersdorf
The Hitler Gang (1944) – Young SS Officer (uncredited)
Mademoiselle Fifi (1944) – Lt. von Eyrick – Called 'Fifi'
Hotel Berlin (1945) – Major Otto Kauders
Escape in the Desert (1945) – Lt. Von Kleist
Paris Underground (1945) – Capt. Kurt von Weber
The Spider (1945) – Ernest, alias The Great Garonne
The Dark Corner (1946) – Anthony Jardine
Sentimental Journey (1946) – Walt Wilson
Unfaithfully Yours (1948) – Tony Windborn
Spy Hunt (1950) – Captain Heimer
Crown Jewels (1950) – Paul Regner
Herzen im Sturm (1951) – Jens Wulf
The Blue Hour (1953) – Dulong
La Paura (1954) – Erich Baumann
The Missing Scientists (1955) – Max Anders
The Enemy Below (1957) – Von Holem
Legion of the Doomed (1958) – Capt. Marcheck
The St. Valentine's Day Massacre (1967) – James Clark

Television
77 Sunset Strip (1958–1963, multiple episodes) – Paul Van Dehn / Rafael Galindos / Kurt Weibel / Kurt Heller / John Luder
Perry Mason (1959–1964, multiple episodes) – Hans Breel / Karl Kadar
Route 66 (1961) – Otto Weller
Combat! (1963–1965) Two episodes, "Glow Against The Sky" as Captain Neubauer & "Finest Hour" as Major Werner
The Man from U.N.C.L.E. (1964) – Stefan Valder
Mission: Impossible (1967) – Polya
Wonder Woman (1976–1977) Two episodes, "The Feminum Mystique: Part 1" as Major Hemmschler & "Anschluss '77" as Koenig

References

External links
 
 
 
 Nelson, Valerie J. (2006, July 19). Kurt Kreuger, 89; Actor Chafed at Being Typecast as a Nazi in 1940s War Movies. The Los Angeles Times

1916 births
2006 deaths
20th-century German male actors
People from the Province of Brandenburg
American male television actors
American male film actors
German male television actors
German male film actors
German emigrants to the United States
Male actors from Beverly Hills, California
Alumni of the London School of Economics
People with acquired American citizenship
20th-century American male actors